Ludlow is a town in Windsor County, Vermont, United States. The population was 2,172 at the 2020 census. Ludlow is the home of Okemo Mountain, a popular ski resort. Before becoming a ski destination, Ludlow was originally a mill town, and was the home of a General Electric plant until 1977. It was named after Ludlow, Massachusetts which is less than 100 miles away. There is also a village of Ludlow in the town.

Geography

Within the town are located the incorporated village of Ludlow and the small hamlets of Grahamville and Smithville. Lake Rescue, a popular lake for recreational activities, is located about three miles north of the town center along Vermont Route 100. Vermont Route 103 passes east–west through the center of town. Interstate 91 does not pass through Ludlow, with the closest access points being Exit 6 in Rockingham and Exit 8 in Weathersfield.

Demographics

As of the census of 2000, there were 2,449 people, 1,060 households, and 658 families residing in the town.  The population density was 69.4 people per square mile (26.8/km2).  There were 3,001 housing units at an average density of 85.1/sq mi (32.9/km2).  The racial makeup of the town was 98.41% White, 0.20% Black or African American, 0.16% Native American, 0.41% Asian, 0.20% from other races, and 0.61% from two or more races. Hispanic or Latino of any race were 0.24% of the population.

There were 1,060 households, out of which 24.3% had children under the age of 18 living with them, 49.5% were married couples living together, 9.9% had a female householder with no husband present, and 37.9% were non-families. 31.5% of all households were made up of individuals, and 11.8% had someone living alone who was 65 years of age or older. The average household size was 2.26 and the average family size was 2.80.

In the town, the population was spread out, with 21.0% under the age of 18, 6.5% from 18 to 24, 26.3% from 25 to 44, 27.6% from 45 to 64, and 18.7% who were 65 years of age or older. The median age was 43 years. For every 100 females, there were 96.2 males. For every 100 females age 18 and over, there were 93.3 males.

The median income for a household in the town was $36,969, and the median income for a family was $44,375. Males had a median income of $30,911 versus $22,179 for females. The per capita income for the town was $24,708.  About 5.9% of families and 7.6% of the population were below the poverty line, including 8.6% of those under age 18 and 8.4% of those age 65 or over.

Notable people 

 Calvin Coolidge, 30th president of the United States; attended Black River Academy
 Abby Maria Hemenway, author and historian
 John F. Murphy, Sr., longtime legislator and politician
 Robert Newton Peck, children's author, most notably A Day No Pigs Would Die    
 Belle L. Pettigrew, teacher, missionary
 Richard F. Pettigrew, lawyer, surveyor, land developer, and US senator from South Dakota
 John G. Sargent, U.S. Attorney General 
 Edward Kirk Warren, businessman

References

External links

 Town & Village of Ludlow official website

Towns in Vermont
 
Towns in Windsor County, Vermont